Karkliniai is a village in southwest Lithuania, Vilkaviškis district. According to census of 2011, it had a population of 435. Near flows the river Rausvė.

History
Since the nineteenth century until 1914 village was volost district center. At the end of 1905 the workers of Karkliniai estate were on strike. After the First World War in 1927 in Karkliniai estate was founded The Girls' Lower Agricultural School.

References

Villages in Marijampolė County